Gérard Vivès (born 30 November 1962) is a French actor, comedian and television presenter. He is better known for playing in the series Les Filles d'à côté from 1993 to 1996, and co-hosting the game show Le Juste Prix from 2009 to 2011, hosted by Vincent Lagaf'.

Biography and career

Early career (1987–93) 
Gérard Vivès was born on 30 November 1962 in Choisy-le-Roi in the department of Val-de-Marne. He began his acting career in the film Aria (1987), portraying a small role of a bodybuilder. In 1992, he briefly appeared in the program Les Nuls L'émission. The same year, he played a small role in the film Les Visiteurs, where he escorts Godefroy le Hardi (played by Jean Reno) when he comes out of the psychiatrist hospital. However, he was uncredited in the film cast.

Les Filles d'à côté (1993–96) 
After playing a few guest roles in a number of AB Productions series including Le Miel et les abeilles, Hélène et les garçons and Le Collège des cœurs brisés, Gérard Vivès became well-known from the audience in the series Les Filles d'à côté, in which he portrays Gérard, an effeminate gym club owner who is a gay stereotype.

The series broadcast on TF1 since 1993, was a success until 1995, period where the actors were progressively replaced one after the other. The series was then renamed Les Nouvelles Filles d'à côté. Playing the character of Gérard, he contributes a lot at the success of the sitcom. In two episodes of the new series, he also portrays Berny, the twin brother of Gérard. The same character of Gérard also appeared in other sitcoms such as Permiers baisers (1994) and La Croisière foll'amour (1996).

Television presenting 
After his role in Les Filles d'à côté, Gérard Vivès became a television presenter. He regularly participated at the game show Drôle de jeu on TF1, presented by Vincent Lagaf' and produced by Hervé Hubert.

He co-hosted on France 3 the program Je passe à la télé from 1997 to 1998, and the game show Le Kouij also produced by Hervé Hubert from 1998 to 1999, with the virtual character Clic. In January 1998, he participated at the game show Fort Boyard in a special episode for the new year.

Le Juste Prix 

In July 2009, he joined the game show Le Juste Prix on TF1, hosted by Vincent Lagaf'. He is the person charged of announcing the candidates, presenting the products and giving the prices. He is on the set behind a desk and often comes down to play small sketches, in which he appears disguised or presents crazy fake gifts.

In October 2010, he had an accident during the filming of Le Juste Prix in the studio. He wore a helmet and was only lightly injured. In November, Vincent Lagaf' stated that he had sixteen stitches on the head, two broken ribs and a twisted ankle. He was absent in the following broadcasts and was not replaced. Since then, Vincent Lagaf' hosted alone the game show, while the "Gafettes" replaced him to present the games to win a product, a kitty or a trip. Gérard Vivès came back in the program on 17 December 2010.

In June 2012, he announced that he would not come back to co-host Le Juste Prix in September. He is replaced by a voiceover and the Gafettes permanently replaced him to present the games for a gift.

Danse avec les stars 

From 6 October to 12 November 2012, Gérard Vivès is a contestant at the third season of Danse avec les stars on TF1 with the dancer Silvia Notargiacomo. He was eliminated and was ranked fifth among the ten contestants.

Splash : le grand plongeon 
In February 2013, he co-hosted the program Splash : le grand plongeon (French version of Splash!) on TF1 with Estelle Denis and Julie Taton.

Filmography

See also 
Le Juste Prix
Danse avec les stars
Danse avec les stars (France season 3)

References

External links 
 

1962 births
Living people
People from Choisy-le-Roi
French male television actors
French television presenters
French people of Portuguese descent